NOAA Ship Fairweather (S 220), originally operated by the United States Coast and Geodetic Survey as USC&GS Fairweather (MSS 20), is an oceanographic research ship operated by the National Oceanic and Atmospheric Administration (NOAA).  Fairweather primarily conducts hydrographic surveys in Alaskan waters, but is considered a multi-mission-capable vessel and has conducted fisheries research cruises.  She is the sister ship of the NOAAS Rainier (S 221) and of the retired NOAAS Mount Mitchell (S 222).

Overview
Fairweather is named for Mount Fairweather in Alaska. She was constructed for the U.S. Coast and Geodetic Survey  as a "medium survey ship" (MSS) by Aerojet-General Shipyards at Jacksonville, Florida. She was laid down on 12 August 1963 and launched on 15 March 1967. The Coast and Geodetic Survey commissioned her as USC&GS Fairweather (MSS 20) in a joint ceremony with her sister ship USC&GS Rainier (MSS 21) at the Pacific Marine Center in Seattle, Washington, on 2 October 1968. When NOAA was established on 3 October 1970 and took over the Coast and Geodetic Survey's assets, she became part of the NOAA fleet as NOAAS Fairweather (S 220). Deactivated in 1989, the ship remained inactive at NOAA's Pacific Marine Center in Seattle for thirteen years.  In 2002, she began a refit at the Cascade General Shipyard in Portland, Oregon, and she was recommissioned in 2004 to aid with the backlog of critical surveys in Alaskan waters.  Her home port is Ketchikan, Alaska.

Crew
Fairweather, like all NOAA ships, is a ship and is operated by commissioned officers of the NOAA Corps and civilian wage mariners.  Fairweather has a complement of 69 people, with additional berthing capability for visitors and scientists.  The ship generally spends over 150 days per year at sea.

Equipment and mission
Fairweather has two Kongsberg Gruppen multibeam echosounders, models EM710 and EM2040. Her four survey launches have Kongsberg EM2040 multibeam echosounders. In addition, Fairweather can tow an L3/Klein System 5000 sidescan sonar, and her launches can be equipped with additional hull-mounted L3/Klein System 5000 sidescan sonars.  These sidescan sonars are used for near-shore Arctic survey operations.  Additionally, Fairweathers personnel routinely establish horizontal and vertical control instruments, such as Global Positioning System (GPS) base stations and tide-level measuring devices, in the remote areas in which the ship works.  Using this technology, the crew of Fairweather can map the ocean floor fully. These data are primarily used to update NOAAs nautical charts, but are increasingly used in other areas such as tsunami displacement modeling, flood mapping, and the mapping of fish habitats.

Service history
On 30 April and 1 May 2017, the NOAA research ship  surveyed an area in the Bering Sea off Dalnoi Point on the northwestern tip of St. George Island in the Pribilof Islands in a search for the wreck of the  crab-fishing boat Destination, which had capsized and sunk in the area with the loss of her entire crew of six men on 11 February 2017.

References

External links

 
 

Ships of the National Oceanic and Atmospheric Administration
Survey ships of the United States
Ships built in Jacksonville, Florida
1967 ships
Alaska-related ships